La School is Allahabad's first residential and day-boarding international school. Situated in the state of Uttar Pradesh in India, the school has been set up under the aegis of Laurels Global UK. The school is affiliated with the Central Board of Secondary Education (CBSE) and headed by Dr. Arun Prakash, who has been the founder principal of seven schools in India and abroad including Delhi Public Schools at  Guwahati (Assam), Jeddah (Saudi Arabia),  Korba (Madhya Pradesh), Bilaspur (Chhattisgarh) and Bongaigaon (Assam). Dr Prakash has also worked as the founder principal at Pathway International School, Dubai (rechristened as Academy International School) and SAI International School, Bhubaneswar.

Physical infrastructure at the school includes horse riding, half-Olympic size swimming pool, large playground and laboratories including Robotics The school has its own school radio, "Radio Laurels", which broadcasts programmes produced, edited and presented by children.

References

External links 

 http://www.bhaskar.com/article/UP-ALAH-little-radio-jockey-arcisha-allahabad-news-4706046-PHO.html?seq=1

International schools in India
Schools in Allahabad